Billy the Kid Trapped is a 1942 American Western film directed by Sam Newfield.

Plot
Imprisoned and sentenced to death for crimes they did not commit, Billy, Fuzzy and Jeff break out of jail. The three escapees discover that there are three impersonators who dress as them committing the crimes. On their mission to clear their names and bring the three impersonators to justice, the trio discovers the town of Mesa Verde where outlaws are given sanctuary in exchange for paying for legal protection.

Cast
 Buster Crabbe as Billy the Kid
 Al St. John as Fuzzy Q. Jones
 Malcolm 'Bud' McTaggart as Jeff Walker
 Anne Jeffreys as Sally Crane
 Glenn Strange as Boss Stanton
 Walter McGrail as Judge Jack McConnell
 Ted Adams as Sheriff John Masters
 Jack Ingram as Henchman Red Barton
 Milton Kibbee as Judge Clarke
 Eddie Phillips as Stage Driver Dave Evans
 Budd Buster as Montana / Fake Fuzzy

See also
The "Billy the Kid" films starring Buster Crabbe: 
 Billy the Kid Wanted (1941)
 Billy the Kid's Round-Up (1941)
 Billy the Kid Trapped (1942)
 Billy the Kid's Smoking Guns (1942)
 Law and Order (1942) 
 Sheriff of Sage Valley (1942) 
 The Mysterious Rider (1942)
 The Kid Rides Again (1943)
 Fugitive of the Plains (1943)
 Western Cyclone (1943)
 Cattle Stampede (1943)
 The Renegade (1943)
 Blazing Frontier (1943)
 Devil Riders (1943)
 Frontier Outlaws (1944)
 Valley of Vengeance (1944)
 The Drifter (1944) 
 Fuzzy Settles Down (1944)
 Rustlers' Hideout (1944)
 Wild Horse Phantom (1944)
 Oath of Vengeance (1944)
 His Brother's Ghost (1945) 
 Thundering Gunslingers (1945)
 Shadows of Death (1945)
 Gangster's Den (1945)
 Stagecoach Outlaws (1945)
 Border Badmen (1945)
 Fighting Bill Carson (1945)
 Prairie Rustlers (1945) 
 Lightning Raiders (1945)
 Terrors on Horseback (1946)
 Gentlemen with Guns (1946)
 Ghost of Hidden Valley (1946)
 Prairie Badmen (1946)
 Overland Riders (1946)
 Outlaws of the Plains (1946)

External links
 
 

1942 films
1942 Western (genre) films
American Western (genre) films
American black-and-white films
Billy the Kid (film series)
Films directed by Sam Newfield
1940s English-language films
1940s American films